Caitlin Durante is a writer, stand-up comedian, and podcast co-host based in Los Angeles. They are a scriptwriter and story analyst, with a master's degree in screen writing from Boston University. They would frequently offer writing workshops in Los Angeles and Boston, which are done online as of Spring 2019. They also teach stand-up comedy to seniors at the Los Angeles LGBT Center. They were the program director for the Nerdmelt Showroom comedy venue at Meltdown Comics in Los Angeles from early 2015 until it closed in April 2018.

Durante is the creator and, along with fellow comedian Jamie Loftus, the co-host of The Bechdel Cast, a weekly podcast about the representation of women in film. They are also the creator of a podcast titled Sludge, where they detail their pancreatitis and the removal of their gallbladder in 2019, along with the issues caused by the US medical system.

On June 2nd 2022 they announced that they are gender fluid and that their pronouns are 'she' and/or 'they'.

References

External links
 
 The Bechdel Cast website

Comedians from California
Comedians from Pennsylvania
Screenwriters from California
Screenwriters from Pennsylvania
American women screenwriters
American women comedians
Boston University alumni
Living people
1986 births
21st-century American women